NGC 1545 is an open cluster  in the constellation Perseus. It was discovered by William Herschel on December 28, 1790. It is located in the north-eastern part of the constellation, a few arcminutes east of the 4.5 magnitude star b Persei, near the equally large and bright NGC 1528 (m = 6.4), which is less than 1.5° towards the northwest. However, it is less dense and rich. The brightest star of the cluster is a K5 III giant star, with 7.1 magnitude, but its membership is questionable. One more 7.9 magnitude star is visible at the north edge of the cluster.

References

External links 
 

1545
Perseus (constellation)
Open clusters